Counting token may refer to:

 Accounting token, historically used for record keeping
 Counter (collectible card games), a gameplay mechanic used in collectible card games
 Counter (board wargames), a gameplay mechanic used in board wargames
 Jeton, a token used on reckoning boards for calculations

See also 
 Counter (disambiguation)